The Generation Orbit X-60 (GOLauncher 1 or GO1) was an air-launched single stage suborbital rocket vehicle produced by Generation Orbit.

Design and development

The first two segments of the GOLauncher 1 Inert Test Article (GO1-ITA) underwent a series of structural ground tests at Mercer University's Engineering Research Center (MERC) in December 2013.

In July 2014, GO was awarded a Phase I Small Business Innovative Research (SBIR) contract from the Air Force Research Laboratory, Aerospace Systems Directorate (AFRL/RQ) for development of GOLauncher 1. The nine-month effort, worth $150,000, focused on requirements definition, configuration trade studies, and trajectory design. In October 2018, the designation X-60A was assigned to the GO1 vehicle.

Applications of the X-60A include access to high altitudes for microgravity, astrophysics,  hypersonics testing and research of avionics. On July 20, 2014, GO flew its first captive carry test platform using a Learjet 35.

References

External links
 
 

Commercial spaceflight
Companies based in Atlanta
Private spaceflight companies